Collision Course is a collaborative album from American rapper Jay-Z and rock band Linkin Park, released on November 30, 2004, by Roc-A-Fella, Machine Shop, Warner Bros. and Def Jam records. From Linkin Park's catalog, Collision Course features three songs from Meteora and four from Hybrid Theory. From Jay-Z's catalog, it features three songs from The Black Album, one from Vol. 3: Life and Times of S. Carter, one from Vol. 2... Hard Knock Life and one from The Blueprint. Before the album, Jay-Z had released collaborations with The Roots and R. Kelly, and Linkin Park had collaborated with various artists on their remix album Reanimation.

The album was inspired by The Grey Album by Danger Mouse, which was a mash-up album between Jay-Z and The Beatles. MTV had originally planned on mashing up only one or two songs, but the project was eventually expanded to a six-song album. The production on the album was mostly handled by Mike Shinoda and Jay-Z, and it was recorded between July 16 and July 19. The album spawned one single, "Numb/Encore" which won Best Rap/Sung Collaboration at the 48th Grammy Awards. The album received generally mixed reviews from music critics but despite that was a commercial success. It debuted at number one on the US Billboard 200 chart, selling 368,000 copies in its first week.

Overview
Due to its short running time at 21:18, with six tracks in total included on the disc, the release has been identified as an EP. All of the tracks included are mashups combining songs by both artists.

The DVD contains behind-the-scenes new footage of the making of the album, as well as the second take of all of the Collision Course songs at The Roxy Theatre on July 18, 2004. Also included are the five scenes from the concert shown on MTV Ultimate Mash-Ups and a picture gallery.

The first single released from the EP, "Numb/Encore", achieved significant airplay on the charts, and stayed on 6 months after its release. "Points of Authority/99 Problems/One Step Closer" was also released to the radio in the US, but was never featured on the Billboard Charts – the videos for both that track and "Jigga What/Faint" were also seen on Kerrang! in the UK. "Izzo/In the End" was also heavily promoted on the official Linkin Park websites.

Background and production
Mike Shinoda revealed in his 2004 Grammy acceptance speech that he would be mashing up with Jay-Z for a record under MTV's Mash Ups show.

The network allowed Jay-Z to choose a group or artist for the mash-up. Jay contacted Shinoda, who began experimenting with mixing the tracks before sending some examples to him. As a result, Jay-Z began working with Shinoda through email. The two decided that instead of combining the existing tracks for the live performance on MTV, they wanted to re-work and re-record parts of the songs to make them fit better. Shinoda explains, "Jay and I realized it's better to re-perform the rap vocals if you're gonna do it to a new beat because the vibe changes and you have to deliver your verse a little differently." Shinoda asked his bandmates to re-record instrumental and vocal tracks as well, and ultimately both parties decided they wanted to release the studio tracks. The entire album was put together within four days.

Sometimes, behind-the-scenes audio can be heard within the album, such as Jay-Z saying "You're wasting your talent, Randy!" before "Big Pimpin'/Papercut", or Shinoda saying "This is fun" before "Izzo/In the End".

Collision Course was the first album of Linkin Park that contained a Parental Advisory sticker, since most of Jay-Z's verses contain profanity (although Shinoda and Chester Bennington are also heard using vulgar language on the album). This album was also made in an edited/censored version. However, the clean version of the album left the words "bitch", "ass", and "hoes" uncensored, which means that "Izzo/In the End" is the same on the clean and explicit versions.

A year after the release of Collision Course, Jay-Z was the executive producer on Mike Shinoda's solo effort Fort Minor's The Rising Tied. Also, the song "High Road" from the same record talks about how some critics negatively received Collision Course.

Critical reception

Collision Course received generally mixed reviews from music critics. David Jeffries of AllMusic praised the album, calling it "awesomely fun". K.B. Tindal of HipHopDX also equally praised the album, saying that the project "will open a passageway for artists who want to dare to be different as well as those who want to work hard to maintain that difference." Steve Juon of RapReviews called the album "an experiment which bodes well since for the most part these two artists  each other."

Meanwhile, Raymond Fiore of Entertainment Weekly, gave a negative review of the album, saying that the pairing of Linkin Park and Jay-Z "comes off like a sanitized nonevent." At the 48th Grammy Awards, the song "Numb/Encore", a mash-up of "Numb" by Linkin Park and "Encore" by Jay-Z, won the Grammy Award for Best Rap/Sung Collaboration.

Commercial performance
Collision Course debuted at number one on the US Billboard 200 chart, selling 368,000 copies in its first week, according to Nielsen Soundscan. This became Jay-Z eighth US number one album and Linkin Park's second.  It also became the first EP ever to top the chart since Alice in Chains' Jar of Flies in 1994. In its second week, the EP dropped to number nine on the chart, selling an additional 186,000 copies. In its third week, the EP dropped to number ten on the chart, selling 236,000 more copies. In its fourth week, the EP climbed to number eight on the chart, selling 283,000 more copies. As of August 2009, the EP has sold 1,934,000 copies in the US. On August 15, 2017, the EP was certified double platinum by the Recording Industry Association of America (RIAA) for combined sales and album-equivalent units of over two million units in the United States.

Track listing

Enhanced content on CD
"Links to Bonus Content"
"Photos"

DVD track listing
Intro
In the Studio
Jay-Z Arrives
Rehearsal
Sound Check
Dirt Off Your Shoulder/Lying from You (Live)
Big Pimpin'/Papercut (Live)
Jigga What/Faint (Live)
Numb/Encore (Live)
Izzo/In the End (Live)
Points of Authority/99 Problems/One Step Closer (Live)
End Credits

"Special Features":
"MTV Ultimate Mash-Ups"
It's Goin' Down
Dirt Off You Shoulder/Lying from You
Jigga What/Faint
Numb/Encore
Points of Authority/99 Problems/One Step Closer

"Photo Gallery"
"5.1 Surround Sound"

Personnel

Linkin Park
 Chester Bennington – vocals (1, 3 & 6), backing vocals (2, 5), lead vocals (4)
 Mike Shinoda – vocals (1, 3 & 4), lead vocals (2, 5 & 6), additional guitar (3), keyboard, piano (4)
 Brad Delson – guitar
 Dave Farrell – bass guitar
 Joseph Hahn – turntables, sampling, programming
 Rob Bourdon – drums

Jay-Z
 Shawn Carter – lead vocals

Production

 Produced and mixed by Mike Shinoda
 Arranged by Brad Delson and Mike Shinoda
 Engineered by Mike Shinoda, John Ewing and Mark Kiczula
 Mastered by Brain "Big Bass" Gardner at Bernie Grundman Mastering
 Executive producers: Shawn Carter and Linkin Park
 A&R: Tom Whalley
 A&R coordination for Warner Bros. Records: Marny Cameron
 Marketing director: Peter Standish
 A&R coordinator: Michael "Stick" Stefrin
 Production coordinator: Ryan DeMarti
 Sample clearance: Eric Weissman for Sample Clearance Limited
 Executive producers: Rob McDermott and John Meneilly
 Creative direction for Warner Bros. Records: Ellen Wakayama
 Project art direction: THE FLEM and Mike Shinoda
 Cover art direction and design: THE FLEM
 Cover and all interior line art illustrations: David Choe
 Digipak and booklet art direction and design: Lawrence Azerrad for LAD
 Photography: Greg Watermann

DVD

 Director: Kimo Proudfoot
 Producer: Matt Caltabiano
 Editor: Kevin McCullough
 Live audio engineer: Guy Charbonneau
 Live audio mix: Mike Shinoda
 Executive producer: Janet Haase
 Head of production: Joby Barnhart
 Post production supervisor: Jason Cohon
 For Sunset Editorial: Nazeli Kodjoian, Sin Halina Sy
 Additional footage produced by Lenny Santiago
 5.1 mixed of Roxy Performance
 DVD post producer: David May
 Associate producer: Raena Winscott
 Menu design: Sean Donelly
 5.1 mix producer: David May
 5.1 mix engineer: Ted Hall
 Assistant engineer: Bruce Balestier
 Audio mix: Mix Magic
 Colorist: Dave Hussey
 Title graphics: Carlos
 Authoring: Cinram
 Live performance filmed July 18, 2004 at The Roxy Theatre, West Hollywood, CA
 Original concept by Michele Megan Dix and Jesse Ignjatovic

Charts

Weekly charts

Year-end charts

Certifications

References

Albums produced by Mike Shinoda
Linkin Park EPs
Jay-Z EPs
Linkin Park video albums
Mashup albums
Collaborative albums
2004 EPs
2004 live albums
Live video albums
Remix EPs
Def Jam Recordings EPs
Def Jam Recordings remix albums
Def Jam Recordings video albums
Def Jam Recordings live albums
Roc-A-Fella Records video albums
Roc-A-Fella Records live albums
Roc-A-Fella Records EPs
Roc-A-Fella Records remix albums
Warner Records remix albums
Warner Records video albums
Warner Records live albums
Warner Records EPs
2004 video albums
Rap rock albums by American artists
Albums produced by Jay-Z